Julio César Armendáriz Hernández (born April 13, 1962) is a Mexican football manager and former player.

References

External links

1962 births
Living people
Footballers from Nuevo León
Sportspeople from Monterrey
Association football midfielders
Mexican football managers
Santos Laguna footballers
Mexican footballers